Torviscosa (locally ) is a comune (municipality) in the Province of Udine in the Italian region of Friuli-Venezia Giulia, located about  northwest of Trieste and about  south of Udine.

The municipality of Torviscosa contains the frazione (subdivision) of Malisana.

Torviscosa borders the following municipalities: Bagnaria Arsa, Cervignano del Friuli, Gonars, Grado, Porpetto, San Giorgio di Nogaro, Terzo d'Aquileia.

Twin towns
 Champ-sur-Drac, France

References

External links

  Official website

Cities and towns in Friuli-Venezia Giulia